Stanley Robert Heath (March 5, 1927 – September 26, 2010) was a quarterback in the National Football League who played 12 games for the Green Bay Packers.

Heath played college football at the University of Nevada, Reno, where he was the nation's top passer. Previously, he had been a member of the Wisconsin Badgers. Heath was the first NCAA quarterback to throw for over 2,000 yards in a season, a mark that would not be surpassed for fifteen years.  He finished 5th in the Heisman Trophy voting in 1948.

In 1948, the Packers drafted him in the 25th round with the 231st overall pick and again in the 1949 NFL Draft with the 5th pick in the 1st round. Heath only played one season with the Packers before moving to the Canadian Football League.

Heath is the son of former major league baseball player Mickey Heath, the uncle of attorney and TruTV television commentator Robert W. Bigelow, and cousin to broadcaster and author Jim Heath.

Heath died at his home in Jesup, Georgia.

See also
 List of NCAA major college football yearly passing leaders
 List of NCAA major college football yearly total offense leaders

References

External links
NFL.com player page
Packers.com
Pro-Football-Reference.com

1927 births
2010 deaths
People from Jesup, Georgia
Sportspeople from Toledo, Ohio
Players of American football from Ohio
American football quarterbacks
Wisconsin Badgers football players
Nevada Wolf Pack football players
Green Bay Packers players
American players of Canadian football
Canadian football quarterbacks
Hamilton Tiger-Cats players
Calgary Stampeders players
Deaths from esophageal cancer
Deaths from cancer in Georgia (U.S. state)